Thachampara is a gram panchayat in the Palakkad district, state of Kerala, India. It is a local government organisation that serves the villages of Karimba-I, Karakurissi, Pottassery-II and Tachampara.

References 
Notes

Citations

Gram panchayats in Palakkad district